The year 1709 in science and technology involved some significant events.

Meteorology
 January – Great Frost in Western Europe.

Physics
 Francis Hauksbee publishes Physico-Mechanical Experiments on Various Subjects, summarizing the results of his many experiments with electricity and other topics.

Technology
 January 10 – Industrial Revolution: Abraham Darby I successfully produces cast iron using coke fuel at his Coalbrookdale blast furnace in Shropshire, England.
 February 5 – Dramatist John Dennis devises the thundersheet as a new method of producing theatrical thunder for his tragedy Appius and Virginia at the Theatre Royal, Drury Lane, London.
 March 28 – Johann Friedrich Böttger reports the first production of hard-paste porcelain in Europe, at Dresden.
 July 13 – Johann Maria Farina founds the first Eau de Cologne and perfume factory in Cologne, Germany.
 August 8 – Hot air balloon of Bartholome de Gusmão flies in Portugal.
 A collapsible umbrella is introduced in Paris.

Awards
 April 9 – Sir Godfrey Copley, 2nd Baronet dies and in his will provides funding to the Royal Society for the annual Copley Medal honoring achievement in science (first awarded in 1731).

Births
 February 24 – Jacques de Vaucanson, French engineer and inventor (died 1782)
 March 3 – Andreas Sigismund Marggraf, German chemist (died 1782)
 March 10 – Georg Steller, German naturalist (died 1746)
 April 17 – Giovanni Domenico Maraldi, French-Italian astronomer (died 1788)
 July 11 – Johan Gottschalk Wallerius, Swedish chemist and mineralogist (died 1785)
 August 8 – Johann Georg Gmelin, German botanist (died 1755)
 November 23 – Julien Offray de La Mettrie, French physician and philosopher (died 1751)

Deaths
 early – Eleanor Glanville, English entomologist (born c. 1654)
 June 29 – Antoine Thomas, Belgian Jesuit astronomer in China (born 1644)
 June 30 – Edward Lhuyd, Welsh naturalist (born 1660)
 October 17 – François Mauriceau, French obstetrician (born 1637)

References

 
18th century in science
1700s in science